Julio Jemison (born 24 February 1994) is a Bahamian footballer who plays for University of the Bahamas FC and the Bahamas national football team. He is also a cricketer who plays for the national team.

Football career
Jemison made his senior international debut on 12 October 2018 in a 6–0 defeat to Antigua and Barbuda in CONCACAF Nations League qualifying.

Cricket career
In April 2022, he was named in the Bahamas' Twenty20 International (T20I) squad for their series against the Cayman Islands. He made his T20I debut on 13 April 2022, for the Bahamas against the Cayman Islands.

References

External links

1994 births
Living people
Bahamian footballers
Bahamas international footballers
Bahamian cricketers
Bahamas Twenty20 International cricketers
Association football goalkeepers